Tunb or Tonb may refer to:

 Tunb District, an administrative subdivision of Iran
 Tunb Rural District, an administrative subdivision of Iran
 Tonb Bariku, a village in Hormozgan Province, Iran
 Tonb-e Bongeru, a village in Hormozgan Province, Iran
 Tonb-e Jaki, a village in Hormozgan Province, Iran
 Tonb-e Siyak, a village in Hormozgan Province, Iran
 Tunb-e Bozorg, a village in Tunb Rural District located on Greater Tunb Island
 Greater and Lesser Tunbs, islands in the Persian Gulf